The 1984 Oklahoma Sooners football team represented the University of Oklahoma in the college football 1984 NCAA Division I-A season.  Oklahoma Sooners football participated in the former Big Eight Conference at that time and played its home games in Gaylord Family Oklahoma Memorial Stadium where it has played its home games since 1923.  The team posted a 9–2–1 overall record and a 6–1 conference record to earn a share of the Conference title under head coach Barry Switzer who took the helm in 1973. This was Switzer's ninth conference title in twelve seasons.

The team was led by All-American Tony Casillas, After winning a share of conference title, it earned a trip to the Orange Bowl for an appearance against the Washington Huskies.  During the season, it faced five ranked opponents (In order, #17 Pitt, #1 Texas, #1 Nebraska, #3 Oklahoma State and #4 Washington).  The last three of these opponents finished the season ranked in the top 10.  It endured a tie against Texas in the Red River Shootout, a loss against a 2–5 Kansas Jayhawks team and a bowl game loss to Washington.

Lydell Carr led the team in rushing with 688 yards, Danny Bradley led the team in passing with 1095 yards, Derrick Shepard led the team in receiving with 392 yards, Placekicker Tim Lashar led the team in scoring with 68 points, Casillas had 10 quarterback sacks,  freshman Brian Bosworth led the team with 133 tackles and Gary Lowell posted 4 interceptions. The defense set a school record that would only be eclipsed by the 1986 team when it allowed only 2.2 yards per rush over the course of the season.

Schedule

Personnel

Season summary

Stanford

Pittsburgh

Baylor

Kansas State

Texas

Iowa State

Kansas

Missouri

Colorado

Nebraska

Oklahoma State

Orange Bowl

Rankings

Awards and honors
All-American: Tony Casillas,
Big Eight Defensive Player of the Year: Casillas
UPI National Lineman of the Year: Casillas
Big Eight Offensive Player of the Year: Danny Bradley
Big Eight Conference MVP: Danny Bradley

Postseason

NFL draft
The following players were drafted into the National Football League following the season.

References

External links
1984 season at SoonerStats.com

Oklahoma
Oklahoma Sooners football seasons
Big Eight Conference football champion seasons
Oklahoma Sooners football